Przemysław Lechowski (born 10 April 1977) is a Polish classical pianist.

Biography
Przemysław Lechowski graduated from the Karol Szymanowski Academy of Music in Katowice, then mastered his piano skills within the post-graduate piano studies of Fryderyk Chopin Music Academy in Warsaw. He performed in prestigious venues in Poland, France, Russia, Germany, Romania, the Czech Republic, Indonesia, China and Lebanon.

Lechowski has been a jury member of international piano competitions. He was a vice-chairman of the Jury of The Galaxy International Piano Competition in Indonesia and — between 2010 and 2022 — the Jury of The Siberian International Chopin Piano Competition in Russia, as well as its representative at the international Chopin Competitions' Conferences organized by the Fryderyk Chopin Institute. In recognition of his piano skills and contribution to the popularization of Chopin's music in Siberia received title of Honorary Professor of the National Research Tomsk State University, but resigned from this title on 24 February 2022 in protest against the 2022 Russian invasion of Ukraine.

Lechowski was an organiser and performer of The Longest Birthday concert (Najdłuższe Urodziny). This 171-hours performance of hundreds artists from Poland and abroad connected two official dates of Frédéric Chopin's 200th birthday – February 22 and March 1 and was described in medias all over the world. The Longest Birthday won two S3KTOR awards from President of Warsaw: Grand Prix and award for the best NGO's cultural event in the capital city of Warsaw in 2010.

He has taken part in the film Meet the World about art of piano, made by French director and composer Fowzi Guerdjou.

Lechowski is active in piano pedagogy, gives regular piano masterclass in Poland, Russia, China and Indonesia. He is member of Siberian Chopin Committee, New Art Association and European Piano Teachers Association (EPTA – Poland).

He lives in Warsaw.

References

External links

International Siberian Chopin Piano Competition - official website
AFP - Marathon concert marks Chopin's birthday
BBC - Frederic Chopin's birthday marked by 171-hour concert
News - Chopin's music in the Tomsk State University

1977 births
Living people
Musicians from Bielsko-Biała
Polish classical pianists
Male classical pianists
21st-century classical pianists
21st-century male musicians